The Midas Touch is a 1938 novel by the British writer Margaret Kennedy. It was her eighth novel, she then took a decade-long break before producing her next work The Feast in 1950. It was a Daily Mail Book of the Month.

Synopsis
Evan Jones, a charismatic young Welshman used to living off his wits arrives in London and falls into the orbit of Corris Morgan, a business tycoon and Bessie Carter Blake a fraudulent psychic.

Film adaptation
In 1940 it was adapted into a film of the same title directed by David MacDonald and starring Barry K. Barnes, Judy Kelly and Frank Cellier.

References

Bibliography
 Goble, Alan. The Complete Index to Literary Sources in Film. Walter de Gruyter, 1999.
 Hartley, Cathy. A Historical Dictionary of British Women. Routledge, 2013.
 Vinson, James. Twentieth-Century Romance and Gothic Writers. Macmillan, 1982.
 Stringer, Jenny & Sutherland, John. The Oxford Companion to Twentieth-century Literature in English. Oxford University Press, 1996.

1938 British novels
Novels by Margaret Kennedy
Novels set in London
Cassell (publisher) books
British novels adapted into films